The North–South railway is the principal railway line serving the country of Vietnam. Trains travelling this line are sometimes referred to as the Reunification Express (referring to the Reunification of Vietnam), although no particular train carries this name officially. The line was established during French colonial rule, and was completed over a period of nearly forty years, from 1899 to 1936. As of 2005, there were 278 stations on the Vietnamese railway network, of which 191 were located along the North–South line.

From World War II through to the Vietnam War, the entire North–South railway sustained major damage from bombings and sabotage. Owing to this damage, and to a subsequent lack of capital investment and maintenance, much of the infrastructure along the North–South railway remains outdated or in poor condition; in turn, lack of infrastructure development has been found to be a root cause for railway accidents along the line, including collisions at level crossings and derailments. Recent rehabilitation projects, supported by official development assistance, have improved the safety and efficiency of the line. As of 2007, 85% of the network's passenger volume and 60% of its cargo volume was transported along the line. The national railway company, Vietnam Railways, owns and operates the line.

Overview 

Trains taking this route pass through a number of areas recognized for their beauty, such as the Hải Vân Pass and Lăng Cô Peninsula near Huế, and Vân Phong Bay near Nha Trang. Typical journeys from one end of the line to the other last about 30 hours. Passengers arriving in Hanoi are able to transfer to several other railway lines, leading to Haiphong, Hạ Long Bay, Thái Nguyên, Lào Cai, Lạng Sơn and the People's Republic of China.

As of 2007, 85% of the network's passenger traffic and 60% of its cargo traffic was transported along the North–South line, corresponding to 3,960.6 million person-km and 2,329.5 million ton-km, respectively. These proportions are only slightly different from those recorded in the early 1990s; 1993 figures reported 82% of passenger traffic and 66% of cargo traffic along the line.

Passenger service
Daily passenger service is provided along the entire North–South railway by state railway company Vietnam Railways. Express service links Hanoi and Ho Chi Minh City, making stops at major stations; local service is also provided along shorter portions of the line, such as from Hanoi to Vinh, Vinh to Đồng Hới, Vinh to Quy Nhon, and so on. The following trains run regularly along the line (each line represents a pair of trains, one southbound and the other northbound):

Freight service
Vietnam Railways provides daily freight transport, mainly between Hanoi and Ho Chi Minh City; freight service ending at Da Nang is also offered. The following trains run regularly along the line (each line represents a pair of trains, one southbound and the other northbound):

History 

In 1895, outgoing Governor-General of French Indochina Jean Marie de Lanessan, convinced of the necessity of building railways to connect the different parts of Indochina, urged his successors to give priority to the construction of a north–south railway connecting Hanoi and Saigon, calling it "the backbone of Indochina" from which all other routes would radiate. It was Paul Doumer, who was appointed as Governor-General in 1897, who put de Lanessan's call into action. Soon after his appointment, Doumer submitted an overarching proposal for railway development in Indochina, including plans for what would eventually become the Yunnan–Vietnam Railway and the North–South railway. The French government approved the construction of the entire Yunnan line and several sections of the North–South line, approving a loan of 200 million francs within the following year. Work began swiftly thereafter, with the Phu Lang Thuong—Lạng Sơn line being upgraded and extended from Hanoi to the Chinese border at Dong Dang by 1902, and the first section of the Yunnan line between Hanoi and Haiphong opening in the same year.

Construction of the first sections of the North–South railway itself began in 1899, and lasted over thirty years, with individual sections completed serially. The first section to be laid down was the Hanoi–Vinh section, built from 1899 to 1905. Next to be built was the Nha Trang–Saigon section from 1905 to 1913; the Saigon–Tan Linh portion was opened in 1908, followed by the Tan Linh–Nha Trang portion in 1913. During this time, tracks were also laid around the city of Huế, leading south to Tourane, and north to Đông Hà. The Huế–Tourane section opened in 1906, and the Huế–Dong Ha line opened in 1908. The Vinh-Huế section was constructed from 1913 to 1927, and finally, the remaining Huế–Nha Trang section was constructed from 1930 to 1936. On 2 October 1936, the entire  Hanoi–Saigon link was formally put into full operation.

As elsewhere in the world, the railways were the sites of active union and labor organization.

The first journeys from end to end of the newly completed line, dubbed the Transindochinois ("Trans-Indochinese"), generally took about 60 hours, or two days and three nights. Trains were generally pulled by French Pacific or Mikado locomotives, and included dining cars and sleeping cars (voitures-couchettes).

Wartime

After the Japanese invasion of French Indochina during World War II, Japanese forces used the Vietnamese railway system extensively, inviting sabotage by the Viet Minh as well as American bombing from the air. Following the exit of the Japanese at the end of the war, efforts were made to repair the seriously damaged North–South line.

Shortly after World War II ended, however, the First Indochina War began, and the Viet Minh's sabotage of the rail system continued, this time against the armies of the French Union. In response, the French began using the armed armoured train La Rafale as both a cargo-carrier and a mobile surveillance unit. In February 1951 the first Rafale was in service on the Saigon-Nha Trang section of the North–South line. Use of the Rafale failed to deter the Viet Minh guerrillas, however, who continued sabotaging the line, making off with its rails under cover of night and creating a  rail network between Ninh Hoa and Da Nang, in a Viet Minh-controlled area. In 1953, the guerrillas attacked La Rafale itself, mining and destroying stone bridges as they passed by. In 1954, following the signature of Geneva Accords, Vietnam was temporarily divided into two parts: the communist North and anti-communist South. The North–South railway was bisected accordingly at Hiền Lương Bridge, a bridge over the Bến Hải River in Quảng Trị Province.

Throughout the Vietnam War, the North–South railway was a target of bombardments and sabotage by both North Vietnamese and South Vietnamese forces. Nevertheless, a relentless campaign of intense bombing and sabotage by the Viet Cong and North Vietnamese regular units resulted in the South Vietnamese railway system being unable to carry significant tonnages. 795 attacks were launched between 1961 and 1964 alone, eventually forcing the South to abandon many large sections of the track. The U.S. Army operating in South Vietnam had considerable interest in the North–South line because of the potential it offered in the bulk movement of cargo at low rates. The system was used to support the Military Assistance Command, Vietnam, construction program and transported hundreds of thousands of tons of rock and gravel to air base and highway sites.

In North Vietnam, American bombing of railways was concentrated on key targets such as railway bridges, both along the North–South railway and along the lines north of Hanoi, such as the Hanoi–Lào Cai and Hanoi–Dong Dang lines. Operation Rolling Thunder was the first large-scale bombing campaign carried out by the U.S. Air Force, taking place from March 2, 1965 until November 1, 1968, when US President Lyndon B. Johnson temporarily called off air raids. Large-scale air raids resumed from May 9 to October 23, 1972, for Operation Linebacker, and again from December 18–29, 1972, for Operation Linebacker II, with fewer target restrictions than Rolling Thunder.

A particularly difficult target for the U.S. Air Force was the Thanh Hóa Bridge, a well-defended combined road/rail bridge in Thanh Hóa Province. One of the first attacks on the bridge took place on April 3–4, 1965. Despite dropping 239 tons of bombs on the bridge during the raid, the bridge remained serviceable; additionally, three American F-105 aircraft were shot down during the raid. The U.S. Navy also conducted Alpha strikes on the bridge. Several times, traffic over the bridge was interrupted, but every time, the North Vietnamese dutifully repaired the damage. The bridge was eventually destroyed by laser-guided smart bombs during separate raids on April 27 and May 13, 1972, as part of Operation Linebacker.

After the Fall of Saigon on 30 April 1975, the Communist government of the newly unified Vietnam took control of the former South Vietnamese railway. Heavily damaged, the war-torn North–South railway line was nevertheless restored and returned to service on 31 December 1976, promoted as a symbol of Vietnamese unity. In the short time between the surrender of the South and the reopening of the line, 1334 bridges, 27 tunnels, 158 stations and 1370 switches had been repaired. Other railway lines that once existed, such as the Da Lat–Thap Cham Railway, were dismantled during this period to provide materials for the repair of the main line.

Accidents and incidents

On 10 March 2015 D19E locomotive No. 968 was written off in an accident near Dien Sanh when it was hauling a passenger train that was in collision with a lorry on a level crossing.

Stations

List of stations 

This abridged list includes all major stations with timetabled services. As of 2005, there were 278 stations on the Vietnamese railway network, of which 191 were located along the North–South line.

Infrastructure

Most of Vietnam's railway infrastructure—including bridges, rail trucks, track beds, rolling stock, signals and communication equipment, and maintenance facilities—has suffered severe deterioration, mainly due to damage inflicted during the Vietnam War and a subsequent lack of capital investment and maintenance. More recently, rehabilitation projects sustained by official development assistance have allowed some of the most critical pieces of infrastructure along the line to be replaced, although much work still remains to be done. Complicating rehabilitation work is seasonal flooding, which, depending on its severity, may cause significant infrastructure damage. For instance, heavy rains falling on Vietnam's north central coast in October 2010 swept away several sections of track in Hà Tĩnh and Quảng Bình provinces; the flooding of many of the nearby provincial roads, which remained several metres underwater, prevented repair crews from reaching the affected sections for weeks.

Tracks
The North–South railway line uses metre gauge, as was commonly used on local railways in France around the time of its construction.

Bridges

Many railway bridges are severely worn from age and have damage dating from the Vietnam War, despite temporary restoration following the war. As of 2007, 278 bridges requiring major rehabilitation remain along the North–South Railway line.

Tunnels

Certain tunnels are inadequately drained and suffer from deterioration in the tunnel lining, causing water leaks that necessitate reductions in speed.

Signalling
The North–South railway line uses a semi-automatic block system, which allows individual signals to work either as automatic signals or manual signals. According to a joint Japanese-Vietnamese evaluation team, the recent installation of additional auto-signal systems at key crossings along the line has contributed to a decline in railway accidents.

Communications
Since 1998, microband Asynchronous Transfer Mode technology has been used along the North–South railway line to send television signals; 64 kbit/s transmission lines are leased from the Vietnam Post and Telecommunications Corporation (VPTC). Along some sections of the line—for example, from Hanoi to Vinh and from Nha Trang to Ho Chi Minh City—a fiber optic cable network has been deployed; Vietnam Railways intends to extend the network along the remaining distance from Vinh to Nha Trang. A switching system featuring digital exchanges is in place, connected via the existing transmission system and the public telephone network. As the modernization of the telecommunication system progresses, manual exchanges are gradually being replaced with digital exchanges.

Safety

Along the North–South railway line, 3,650 level crossings were counted, 3,000 (or 82%) of which had no barriers, alarm systems or guards. As a result, accidents involving vehicles and pedestrians have occurred. A researcher from Villanova University noted "There are numerous safety issues with level crossings...usually, an accident occurs every day." In addition, the center of the country is subject to violent annual flooding and bridges are often swept away, causing lengthy closures.

Along with recent efforts aimed at infrastructure rehabilitation, the recent adoption of safety measures by Vietnam Railways has led to a decline in railway accidents. These measures include: public awareness campaigns on railway safety in the media; construction of fences and safety barriers at critical level crossings in major cities; mobilization of volunteers for traffic control at train stations and level crossings, especially during holiday seasons; the installation of additional auto-signal systems; and the construction of flyovers and underpasses to redirect traffic.

Infrastructure rehabilitation
The condition of railway infrastructure in Vietnam, although improving, is still poor enough overall to require rehabilitation. Rail transport only became a national priority for the Vietnamese government around the mid-1990s, at which point most of the railway network was severely degraded, having received only temporary repair from damages suffered during decades of war.

From 1994 to 2005, a major bridge rehabilitation project took place on the North–South railway line, with the Pacific Consultants International Group and Japan Transportation Consultants providing consultancy services. The overall project cost was JPY 11,020 million, or 18% less than the budgeted cost.

In 2007, Vietnam Railways awarded an additional VND 150 billion (US$9.5 million) five-year contract for consultancy services to Japan Transportation Consultants, the Pacific Consultants International Group, and the Japan Railway Technical Service (Jarts), regarding a VND 2.47 trillion project to further improve bridge and railway safety on the North–South line. The project was expected to be completed in 2010.

Development

North–South Express Railway

Funding of the $56 billion line would mainly come from the Vietnamese government; reports suggest Japanese development aid could be made available in stages, conditioned on the adoption of Shinkansen technology. Once completed, the high-speed rail line would allow trains to complete the Hanoi-Ho Chi Minh City journey in approximately 6 hours. Vietnam's National Assembly rejected the existing plan for the line in June 2010, and asked for further study of the project.

Gallery

See also 

 List of railway lines in Vietnam
 North–South Express Railway (Vietnam)
 Vietnam Railways

Notes and references 
Notes

References

Bibliography

 Hulot, Frédéric. Les chemins de fer de la France d'outre-mer, tome 1 l'Indochine, le Yunnan. La Régordane. 1990.

External links 
 Official Website of Vietnam Railways
 Ministry of Transport, Vietnam

Railway lines in Vietnam
Metre gauge railways in Vietnam
Railway lines opened in 1936
1936 establishments in Vietnam
1936 establishments in French Indochina
Transport in Vietnam
Articles containing video clips